Evgeni Aleksandrovich Rogov (8 April 1929 – 6 July 1996) was a Russian and Soviet football player and manager.

Career
Rogov was born in Chelyabinsk. He played for VVS Moscow and Lokomotiv Moscow.

He coached Lokomotiv Moscow, Central African Republic
and Algeria.

He died aged 67 on 6 July 1996 in Moscow.

References

External links 
  Profile

1929 births
1996 deaths
Russian footballers
Soviet footballers
FC Lokomotiv Moscow players
Association football defenders
Russian football managers
Soviet football managers
FC Lokomotiv Moscow managers
Central African Republic national football team managers
Algeria national football team managers
Raja CA managers
Russian expatriate football managers
1988 African Cup of Nations managers
Soviet expatriate sportspeople in Algeria
Russian expatriate sportspeople in Algeria
Expatriate football managers in Algeria
Russian expatriate sportspeople in Morocco
Expatriate football managers in Morocco
Sportspeople from Chelyabinsk
Botola managers